Stanley Cooperman (October 22, 1929 – April 26, 1976) was a New York City-born poet. Among his books are Cannibals and among his poems are "Masada". Cooperman was a co-signatory to the 1968 manifesto "Poet Power."

Born in New York City on October 22, 1929, Stanley Cooperman became a Canadian citizen in 1972. Cooperman  received his B.A. in 1951 and M.A. in 1955 from New York University and his Ph.D. in 1961 from the Indiana University, where he also taught. He taught English at Simon Fraser University from 1969 to 1976. He previously taught at Tehran University through a Fulbright Award, the University of Oregon and Hofstra University.

Selected publications

Ernest Hemingway's the Old Man and the Sea, a Critical Commentary (Baltimore: The Johns Hopkins Press, 1963).
The Novels of Ernest Hemingway: A Study Guide (New York: Monarch Press, 1965).
The Novels of F. Scott Fitzierald: A Study Guide (New York: Monarch Press, 1965).
The Novels of John Steinbeck: A Study Guide (New York: Monarch Press, 1966).
World War I and the American Novel (Johns Hopkins University Press, 1967)
Owl Behind the Door (McClelland & Stewart, 1968)
The Day of the Parrot and Other Poems (University of Nebraska Press, 1968)
Cappelbaum's Dance (University of Nebraska Press, 1970)
Cannibals (Oberon, 1972)
Greco's Book (Vancouver: The author, 1974).
Canadian Gothic and Other Poems (Intermedia, 1976)
Greco's Last Book: Selected Poems (Intermedia, 1980). Edited by Fred Candelaria.

Death

Cooperman committed suicide in 1976 at the age of 47.

References

1929 births
1976 deaths
20th-century American poets
American emigrants to Canada
New York University alumni
Indiana University alumni
Academic staff of Simon Fraser University
American expatriates in Iran
Academic staff of the University of Tehran
University of Oregon faculty
Hofstra University faculty
1976 suicides
Suicides by firearm in British Columbia